The 2012 Tour de Pologne was the 69th running of the Tour de Pologne cycling stage race. It started on 10 July in Karpacz and ended on 16 July in Kraków, after seven stages. It was the 19th race of the 2012 UCI World Tour season.

The race was won by  rider Moreno Moser, who claimed the leader's yellow jersey after winning the penultimate stage, and maintained the lead of the race until its conclusion; he also won the race's opening stage, his first wins at World Tour level. Moser's winning margin over runner-up Michał Kwiatkowski of  – the highest-placed Polish rider – was five seconds, and 's Sergio Henao completed the podium, eleven seconds down on Kwiatkowski and sixteen behind Moser.

In the race's other classifications,  rider Tomasz Marczyński won the King of the Mountains classification, 's Ben Swift won the white jersey for the points classification after winning two stages during the event, and Adrian Kurek of  won the intermediate sprints classification, for the second year in succession. As well as their two-stage victories,  finished at the head of the teams classification.

Schedule
Aside from entering the Czech Republic (to the city of Český Těšín on the border with Poland) during the third stage, the race stages started and ended in Polish locations.

Participating teams
As the Tour de Pologne was a UCI World Tour event, all eighteen UCI ProTeams were invited automatically and obligated to send a squad. Along with Team Poland BGŻ – the Polish national team – six other squads were given wildcard places into the race, and as such, formed the event's 25-team peloton.

The twenty-five teams that competed in the race were:

Stages

Stage 1
10 July 2012 — Karpacz to Jelenia Góra, 

Included on each lap was a first-category climb at the Karpacz Orlinek, a site for ski jumping during the winter months, while on the third full lap of the circuit, there was an intermediate sprint in Karpacz offering bonus seconds towards the general classification.

The quintet opened up a maximum advantage of nine minutes over the rest of the field during the second circuit, as rain began to dampen the parcours, and it eventually resulted in a crash in the main field. Among the riders going down were  teammates Tom Boonen and Niki Terpstra, as well as 's Fabio Sabatini; of the riders, only Boonen was able to rejoin the peloton, as Terpstra abandoned after the crash due to injuries suffered, and Sabatini was taken off the parcours in an ambulance but suffered only heavy bruising in the incident. 's Sergio Henao tried to chase down the leaders from out of peloton, but could not bridge the gap to them. Marycz, Teklehaymanot and Georges dropped Rocchetti and Matysiak with around  remaining of the stage, with  bringing the advantage to beneath two minutes.

Georges looked to go clear on his own, on the fourth and final climb of the Karpacz Orlinek but could not hold off until the summit when the peloton, now led by Henao and his teammate Lars Petter Nordhaug, swept past him. Alexandr Kolobnev launched an attack on the descent of the climb for  but was brought back to the peloton. Christophe Le Mével then went clear for  but he was passed by a secondary move by Kolobnev inside of the final  of the stage. However, Kolobnev faded on the false flat to the finish; from the reduced pack, 's Moreno Moser launched a late attack – akin to his victories in the Trofeo Laigueglia and the Eschborn-Frankfurt City Loop earlier in the year – and managed to hold off the rest of the field for his first World Tour victory. Moser finished ahead of the best-placed Polish rider Michał Kwiatkowski and  rider Lars Boom.

Stage 2
11 July 2012 — Wałbrzych to Opole, 

On the route from Wałbrzych, there were three intermediate sprint points in the towns of Paczków, Prudnik and Krapkowice, as well as a third-category climb in the village of Chrząszczyce,  from the end of the stage. The final  of the stage was conducted in three laps of a  circuit within Opole. The breakaway was almost entirely made up of home riders, as Polish trio Damian Walczak, Łukasz Bodnar (both riding for the representative Team Poland BGŻ) and 's Adrian Kurek were joined at the head of proceedings by Italian Diego Caccia, riding for the  team.

Bodnar did however gain nine seconds during the stage, by taking first place at each of the three intermediate sprint points, and assumed the red jersey for that classification. Once he had done so, he returned to the peloton to allow for their advantage to grow once again. The leaders were three minutes clear with  remaining, when Caccia made his move off the front. By the time he crossed the finish line in Opole for the first time, with  left, the lead had been almost halved. Moser maintained his race lead, despite crashing late on.

Stage 3
12 July 2012 — Kędzierzyn-Koźle to Cieszyn, 

The stage started in Kędzierzyn-Koźle, moving south-west towards the finish including a short distance covered in the Czech Republic around Český Těšín, before returning to Poland for the finish in Cieszyn. There were three categorised climbs, with two ascents of the Kubalonka climb – one during each lap of a -long intermediary circuit around the towns of Wisła and Czarne – and the other being a third of the way around a  closing circuit in Cieszyn. As well as the climbs, there were also three intermediate sprint points during the  parcours, held in Skoczów, Ustroń and in Český Těšín, prior to entering the finishing circuit which was to be completed three times. Three riders –  rider Fumiyuki Beppu, 's Gabriele Bosisio and Mateusz Taciak representing the national Team Poland BGŻ – went clear in the early kilometres of the stage, and quickly established a substantial lead on the road, reaching a maximum of seventeen minutes. However, this advantage was still not enough to last all the way to the finish; indeed, the trio were caught at the start of the first of three finishing circuits in Cieszyn.

Rutkiewicz went alone from the lead group, and was eventually caught by 's Sergio Henao, who had attacked from the main field; Henao had been placed seventh in the general classification overnight, trailing leader Moreno Moser by just ten seconds, with ten bonus seconds on offer at the stage finish for the winner. Moser's overall lead was reduced to one second, after Štybar's teammate Michał Kwiatkowski gained three seconds at one of the sprint points.

Stage 4
13 July 2012 — Będzin to Katowice, 

The fourth stage was seen as the best chance for the sprinters to take a stage victory out of the entire Tour de Pologne. At , the parcours was the shortest of the Tour, with circuits in both the start town of Będzin – three laps of a  circuit – and in the finishing location of Katowice, where six laps of an  circuit were completed. There were two categorised climbs during the stage – both third-category – at Syberka and on the penultimate finishing circuit, as well as three intermediate sprint points at Dąbrowa Górnicza, Siemianowice Śląskie and on the fourth Katowice circuit.

However, they were not to be successful as they were brought back by the peloton on the final circuit in Katowice. Polish national champion Michał Gołaś looked to go clear, but he could not gain sufficient ground on the peloton in the closing stages. Thus, it was down to the sprinters' teams to sort out the order and tempo at the front of the main field.  looked to get Ben Swift into play for the sprint, but Aidis Kruopis launched his sprint off Swift's wheel, and took his first win at World Tour level. Kwiatkowski held his two-second lead to the end of the stage, to take the yellow jersey from Moser. Kurek moved into the red jersey, thanks to points achieved in the day's breakaway.

Stage 5
14 July 2012 — Rabka-Zdrój to Zakopane, 

With six categorised climbs during the stage – one of which, the Wierch Olczański, came in the early running of the stage before three passes of a climb into Zakopane  before the finish, as well as two climbs of the Głodówka – the stage was not originally suited towards the sprinters.

As the leaders approached Zakopane for the first time, Ignatiev saw fit to attack off the front of the lead quintet and went away solo from the group. Delage later launched his own move, but remained a couple of minutes behind his former breakaway companion. However, he did not make much headway from the chasing peloton, who closed down a minute's gap before the second and final intermediate sprint of the day, coming with  remaining in the town of Cyrhla. After Ignatiev had pedalled through for the three bonus seconds on offer for first, 's Moreno Moser, trailing Kwiatkowski by two seconds in the general classification overnight, made a bold move for the bonus time at the line. He did gain the two seconds for second place, but Kwiatkowski countered his move to take the one second for third, maintaining his overall lead by one second.

Ignatiev remained off the front until halfway around the final circuit, when he was caught by 's David López García, but both riders were eventually brought back to the peloton. Four riders made a counter-move immediately after that, and managed to gather up a 25-second advantage into the final  of the stage. 's Jan Bakelants broke the group up with a solo attack, which sent Maciej Bodnar back to the peloton, as he could not stay with the group. Bodnar's teammate Elia Viviani was behind, but was beaten to the sprint by the points leader Ben Swift, who took his second win of the race, and extended his lead in the classification.

Stage 6
15 July 2012 — Terma Bukowina Tatrzańska to Bukowina Tatrzańska, 

Mountains classification leader Daniel Teklehaymanot took maximum points at the day's opening climb prior to the breakaway being formed, extending his lead in the classification.

The quintet were able to establish an advantage of around five minutes midway through the stage, but their advantage was not a stage-winning gap, as attacks from the peloton meant that they were surpassed on the final lap. Stannard's teammate Sergio Henao counter-attacked immediately after, where he was chased by 's Przemysław Niemiec and  rider Jon Izagirre. Stannard attacked once again, before Henao took a second chance of his own, attacking off the front of the peloton. Henao resisted capture until  to go, where a quick-finishing Moreno Moser surpassed him for his second stage win at the race. With Henao finishing second ahead of 's Michał Kwiatkowski, Moser took the overall lead by five seconds, thanks to time bonuses.

Stage 7
16 July 2012 — Kraków to Kraków, 

As was the case in the 2011 edition of the race, the final general classification battle was to come down to a final circuit race around Kraków. Each circuit had an intermediate sprint point on one of the laps, while there was only one categorised climb during the Wieliczka loop,  before the end of the second lap. The group managed to establish an advantage of around three minutes, but the peloton – being led by the  team, protecting the race leader Moreno Moser – were being attentive in light of the close margins in the general classification.

Bonus seconds on offer at the intermediate sprint points, but the breakaway took all the available points during the circuits, meaning that Moser could only be beaten at the stage finish. 's Jarosław Marycz and  rider Juan Antonio Flecha looked to break the lead group apart on the final lap, before Marycz attacked solo, but the group were eventually brought back by the peloton with  remaining. It was at this point that a torrential downpour hit the race, and made the sprint for the line treacherous.  moved forward in the peloton for their sprinter John Degenkolb, and Degenkolb managed to hold off the advances of  duo Mathew Hayman and Ben Swift to take the victory, his sixth of the season. Moser finished in the pack to secure the general classification by five seconds ahead of Štybar's teammate Michał Kwiatkowski.

Classification leadership table
In the 2012 Tour de Pologne, four different jerseys were awarded. For the general classification, calculated by adding each cyclist's finishing times on each stage, and allowing time bonuses in intermediate sprints and at the finish in mass-start stages, the leader received a yellow jersey. This classification was considered the most important of the 2012 Tour de Pologne, and the winner of the classification is the winner of the race.

There was also a mountains classification, the leadership of which was marked by a fuchsia jersey, representing the Tauron Group, the sponsors of the classification. In the mountains classification, points were won by reaching the top of a climb before other cyclists, with more points available for the higher-categorised climbs, which were split into three distinctive categories. Double points were awarded for the final climb of the race, on the penultimate stage. The third jersey represented the points classification, marked by a white-and-red jersey. In the points classification, cyclists got points for finishing in the top 20 in a stage. For all stages, the win earned 20 points, second place earned 19 points, third 18, and one point fewer per place down to a single point for 20th.

The fourth jersey represented the sprints classification, marked by a red jersey. In the sprints classification, cyclists received points for finishing in the top 3 at intermediate sprint points during each stage, with the exception of the individual time trial stages. There was also a classification for teams, in which the times of the best three cyclists per team on each stage were added together; the leading team at the end of the race was the team with the lowest total time.

Notes
 In stages 2 and 4, Michał Kwiatkowski, who was second in the points classification, wore the white jersey, because Moreno Moser (in first place) wore the yellow jersey as leader of the general classification during that stage.

References

External links

 

 

Tour de Pologne
Tour de Pologne
Tour de Pologne
July 2012 sports events in Europe